The 2016 Wheelchair Doubles Masters (also known as the 2016 Uniqlo Wheelchair Doubles Masters for sponsorship reasons) is a wheelchair tennis tournament played in Mission Viejo, California, United States, from 2 to 6 November 2016. It is the season-ending event for the highest-ranked wheelchair tennis doubles players on the 2016 ITF Wheelchair Tennis Tour.

Tournament
The 2016 Uniqlo Wheelchair Doubles Masters took place from 2 to 6 November in Mission Viejo, California, United States. It was the 17th edition of the tournament (14th for quad players). The tournament is run by the International Tennis Federation (ITF) and is part of the 2016 ITF Wheelchair Tennis Tour. The event takes place on hard courts. It serves as the season-ending championships for doubles players on the ITF Wheelchair Tennis Tour.
The eight pairs who qualify for the men's event and six pairs who qualify for women's event are split into two groups of three or four. The four pairs who qualify for the quad event compete in one group. During this stage, pairs compete in a round-robin format (meaning pairs play against all the other players in their group).
In the men's and women's events the two pairs with the best results in each group progress to the semifinals, where the winners of a group face the runners-up of the other group. In the quad event, the top two pairs progress to the final. This stage, however, is a knock-out stage.

Format
The Wheelchair Doubles Masters has a round-robin format, with eight men's pairs, six women's pairs and four quad pairs competing. The seeds are determined by the UNIQLO Wheelchair Tennis Rankings as they stood on 26 September 2016. All matches are the best of three tie-break sets, including the final.

Qualified pairs
The following pairs qualified for the 2016 Wheelchair Doubles Masters, based upon rankings as at 26 September 2016.

Men's doubles

Women's singles

Quad singles

Champions

Men's doubles

 Stéphane Houdet /  Nicolas Peifer def.  Gustavo Fernández /  Joachim Gérard, 2–6, 6–3, 7–5

Women's doubles

 Diede de Groot /  Lucy Shuker def.  Louise Hunt /  Dana Mathewson, 6–3, 4–6, 6–4

Quad doubles

 Antony Cotterill /  Andrew Lapthorne def.  Nick Taylor /  David Wagner, 7–5, 1–6, 6–4

See also
ITF Wheelchair Tennis Tour
2016 Wheelchair Tennis Masters

References

External links
 
 ITF tournament profile

Masters, 2016